Cyprogenia aberti, the western fanshell, edible naiad,  edible pearly mussel, or western fanshell mussel,  is a species of freshwater mussel, an aquatic bivalve mollusk in the family Unionidae, the river mussels.

This species is endemic to the United States.

References

Molluscs of the United States
Unionidae
Bivalves described in 1850
Taxa named by Timothy Abbott Conrad
Taxonomy articles created by Polbot